The Kedayan (also known as Kadayan, Kadaian or Kadyan) are an ethnic group residing in Brunei, Federal Territory of Labuan, southwest of Sabah, and north of Sarawak on the island of Borneo. According to the Language and Literature Bureau of Brunei, the Kedayan language (ISO 639-3: kxd) is spoken by about 30,000 people in Brunei, and it has been claimed that there are a further 46,500 speakers in Sabah and 37,000 in Sarawak. In Sabah the Kedayan mainly live in the cities of Sipitang, Beaufort, Kuala Penyu and Papar. In Sarawak the Kedayans mostly reside in Lawas, Limbang, Miri and the Subis area.

History 

The origins of the Kedayans are uncertain. Some of them believe their people were originally from Ponorogo, Java, which they left during the reign of Sultan Bolkiah. Because of his fame as a sea captain and voyager, the Sultan was well-known to the people of Java, Sumatra and the Philippines. It is believed that when the Sultan arrived to the island of Java, he became interested in the local agricultural techniques. He brought some of the Javanese farmers back to his country to spread their techniques. The farmers inter-married with the local Bruneian Malay people, giving birth to the Kedayan ethnicity. Most Kedayans have adopted Islam since the Islamic era of the Sultanate of Brunei. They have also adopted Malay culture. The Kedayans are recognized as one of the indigenous people of Borneo. They are experts in making traditional medicines. The Kedayans are well known for their cultivation of medicinal plants, which they grow to treat a wide range of ailments and to make tonics.

The language of one of the indigenous tribes, the Banjar people in Kutai, East Kalimantan, Indonesia, is said to share more than 90% of the vocabulary with the Kedayan language, despite the fact that the Banjarese do not refer to themselves as Kedayans. Both the Kedayans and the Banjarese are related, to a certain extent, because of the similarities in their languages.

Language 
The Kedayan language is similar to Brunei Malay, and it has been claimed that as many as 94% of the words in the two languages are cognate.

The main differences in pronunciation are that Kedayan has initial /h/ while Brunei Malay does not, so Kedayan hutan (forest) is utan in Brunei Malay; and Kedayan does not have /r/, so Malay rumah (house) is umah in Kedayan.

Notable people 
 Sapawi Ahmad – Malaysia representative for Sipitang constituency
 Ahmad Lai Bujang – Malaysia representative for Sibuti constituency
 Dr. Yusof Yacob - Former Sabah State Minister.
Matbali Musah - Malaysia representative for Sipitang constituency.
 Pengiran Ahmad Raffae – The second of The head of State of Sabah

References

External links 

North Kalimantan
Ethnic groups in Brunei
Ethnic groups in Sabah
Ethnic groups in Sarawak